The Gibraltar women's national under-16 basketball team is a national basketball team of Gibraltar, administered by the Gibraltar Amateur Basketball Association. It represents the country in women's international under-16 basketball competitions.

The team participated at every FIBA U16 European Championship Division C since its establishment in 2000. The best result was the fourth place in 2004, 2006, 2012 and 2013.

See also
Gibraltar women's national basketball team
Gibraltar women's national under-18 basketball team
Gibraltar men's national under-16 basketball team

References

External links
Archived records of Gibraltar team participations

Basketball in Gibraltar
Women's national under-16 basketball teams
Basketball